John Avery Jr. (September 2, 1739 – June 7, 1806) was an American politician who served as the 1st Massachusetts Secretary of the Commonwealth.

Family
Avery's was a direct descendant of Dr. William Avery from Barkham, Berkshire, England. Dr. William Avery immigrated to Dedham, Massachusetts in 1650.

Early life
Avery was born to John and Mary (Deming) Avery on September 2, 1739.

Family life
Avery married Mary (Polly) Cushing in April 1769, they had ten children.

Sons of Liberty
Avery was a member of the Sons of Liberty.

Massachusetts Secretary
Avery had served as Deputy Secretary of the Province of Massachusetts Bay under Samuel Adams.  Avery defeated Adams at the polls to be the first Massachusetts Secretary of the Commonwealth.

Death
Avery died on June 7, 1806.

Notes

1739 births
1806 deaths
American people of English descent
Secretaries of the Commonwealth of Massachusetts
18th-century American people
19th-century American politicians
Harvard College alumni
People from colonial Boston
People of colonial Massachusetts